Scottish Psalter may refer to:

Scottish Psalter (1564), the first Scottish Psalter published in 1564.
Scots Metrical Psalter of 1650.  See Hymnbooks of the Church of Scotland.